Huntley is a suburb of the City of Wollongong to the west of Dapto.

The Geographical Names Board of New South Wales assigned the name of Huntley to the suburb on 5 August 2005.  It had previously been called West Dapto or considered to be part of Avondale. It was named after a coal mine located within its boundary. The mine's name "Huntley" came from Huntly, a coal mining town in the North Island of New Zealand, which originally had this spelling. The original owners of the Huntley colliery, Illawarra Coal, had associations with the New Zealand mine.

References

Suburbs of Wollongong